Excelsior is an authentically restored fishing smack of the Lowestoft fishing fleet and a member of the National Historic Fleet. She was built by John Chambers of Lowestoft in 1921 and worked until 1936 before being converted into a motor coaster.</ref> In 2021 Excelsior will celebrate her 100th birthday. During her time as a motor coaster she was known as Svinør and worked mainly in Norwegian waters before returning to Lowestoft in 1972.

Excelsior was restored in 1989 and operates as a sail training vessel based out of Lowestoft, able to accommodate up to 17 people, including 12 trainees or passengers.

History

The Demonstration of History in Her Physical Fabric 

EXCELSIOR was built in 1921 by John Chambers & Co, who were the ports leading smack builders. She was designed by Ernest Chambers drawing upon the firm's accumulated experience, and she and her sisters represent an apogee of Lowestoft smack design. They were highly regarded, and all the sisters survived their working lives whatever the North Sea threw at them.  

By contrast her construction was carried out on speculation as a 'hospital job' for the yard apprentice boys following the first World War. Good timber was in short supply following the Admiralty's extensive programme of wooden Steam Drifter construction – John Chambers & Co being selected as the lead contractor. This resulted in some sapwood being used in her construction and all her knees being 'short grained'. (Tight oak bends remain the most difficult timbers to obtain today.) However, her longevity speaks volumes for the workmanship, and any inferior timber was subsequently replaced in an extensive rebuild. 

After fishing for fourteen years she was sold to Norway and converted to a motor coaster. The alterations undertaken were minimal as her hull was so new. They merely involved removing the centreline deck structures, cutting a couple of cargo hatches and a cabin into the deck, and erecting a housing over an engine with a wheelhouse on top. The hull and bulwarks were left unaltered, although below decks the hull was completely stripped and new bulkheads erected to create a crew cuddy, hold, and engine room. Loaded to her marks she could manage 100 tons deadweight.

When John Wylson was looking for a sea-going sailing hull with headroom below decks that could be restored back to sailing condition there were many such conversions of former British sailing trawlers in Norway and Sweden at that time (1971). In Britain he had failed to find any former commercial sailing vessel large enough, still afloat, and available, other than Thames barges. He was particularly attracted to the former Excelsior (LT472) which was still largely in original condition and coming up for sale. Another factor was that none of the very numerous fleet of Lowestoft Smacks existed in sailing condition in the UK at that time. The Leader (ex LT474) had been converted into a sail training vessel at Gothenburg, and Keywardin (ex LT1192) was in Greece, but Bermudan-rigged with aluminium spars. In fact, none of the large British sailing trawlers had been restored - those that were sailing having been converted into yachts with deckhouses and light-weight gear.

By that stage in her life Excelsior, then called Svinør of Mandal, had extensive rot in her topsides and bulwarks, and needed rebuilding. However, unlike other vessels, her original bulwarks had survived and were therefore a pattern for accurate replacement. Mortices for carlings in the original deck beams and other evidence revealed the location of all the original centre-line structures. A decision was therefore made to purchase and repatriate her to Lowestoft where all the facilities existed for the restoration of a local smack along with the necessary skills.  

John Wylson and a new partner, Mark Trevitt of Beccles, set about the necessary reconstruction, removing virtually all trace of her Norwegian life as a motor coaster in the process. (The only Norwegian part remaining today being the engine beds and stern tube).  

Inadvertently the decision had been taken not to preserve the bastardised remains of a Lowestoft smack in order to retain the entire history of the vessel through its fabric. This was fortunate as such vessels are of limited academic, and no public interest, besides which, many more extensively converted ex-British smacks and luggers existed in Norway and Sweden, one of which, the Fremad II (the former Lowestoft lugger, or sailing drifter, Boy Jack LT199) has now become a museum ship to this numerous class of vessel.

Back in Lowestoft extensive research was undertaken into contemporary models and photographs, and by interviewing surviving shipwrights, smacksmen, and crew members, so that Excelsior could be re-build back to as-built condition. This was only possible because Lowestoft was the last fishing station to operate large smacks, and a significant body of knowledge still survived up to that time, which was the 1970s and 80s.  

The area below decks, where all evidence of the original had gone, was used to facilitate a new revenue-earning future for Excelsior, by providing accommodation. Modern safety requirements, like an engine and navigational equipment was also incorporated.  

The present fabric is therefore a combination of the original; exact replacement of the original; recreation of the original under the direction of the original builders and users; and new material needed to generate an income and ensure compliance with modern safety requirements. Most of the new material is below decks, and anything required above is removeable, such as an extra skylight in place of the fish hatch, and a hoodway in place of the warproom hatch, but the hatch boards can be reinstated. In fact, all modern additions on deck can be removed in a couple of days, which is done from time to time and to varying degrees for film work or trawling contracts.   

This approach was necessary because it was abundantly clear by the 1970s that the income generated as a museum ship would barely pay the cost of collecting the money, let alone for any maintenance. Furthermore, wooden hulls that no longer go to sea rot incredibly quickly if exposed to fresh water (i.e. rainwater). This fact has been known for some time which is why Nelsonian docks are roofed over and why ships 'in ordinary' are also 'roofed over' (e.g. HMS Unicorn).  

A new revenue-earning and seagoing use was therefore considered essential for the survival of the vessel's fabric, and for the perpetuation of the skills and knowledge associated with her.   

"Ships and men rot in port!"
Admiral Lord Nelson

Associational Links 

Lowestoft was the largest sailing trawling fishing station in the 20th century with a maximum of 340 First Class (over 25 NRT) smacks in 1913.  Ramsgate followed with around 220 smacks, and then Brixham with about 160. All large smacks were reputed to have left the Humber by 1900.

The Ramsgate fleet ceased fishing in the late 1920s, the Brixham boats in the mid 1930s, but a small fleet of Lowestoft smacks were still fishing at the beginning of the Second World War when the Admiralty ordered that they be laid up as the Navy could not provide protection. Excelsior is therefore representative of the largest and longest-lived fleet of sailing trawlers of the 20th century.

Excelsior's first skipper was Jimmy Strong, who fought U-Boats during the First World War in an armed smack. Fishing boat losses to U-Boats were becoming so great at Lowestoft that smacksmen clamoured for self-defence. Some smacks were therefore fitted with a 3 pdr., which was the largest gun that the structure of a smack could withstand. A typical action was that which took place on 15th August 1917 between HMAT Nelson (ex G.& E. LT649) and SM UC-63 (a newly commissioned UC61 Class coastal minelaying U-Boat). Nelson's fisherman skipper, Tom Crisp, went down with his smack fighting till the end, for which he was posthumously awarded the Victoria Cross. 

Excelsior was no different from other smacks in the Lowestoft fleet at that time, and today she stands as a testament to a small part of the history of the First World War.  

In the Second World War Excelsior's Norwegian owner, Bjorn Stensland, did what he could for his country in the circumstances, which turned out to be a great help to the people of Bodo in North Norway. When Germany invaded in 1940 Excelsior was delivering a cargo of firewood.  Having unloaded, the town was bombed and as the houses were largely built of wood, there was a conflagration so Excelsior was able to ferry the townsfolk to safety on nearby islands until she herself was dive-bombed while alongside a jetty. The bomb missed, but the jetty was destroyed. Shaken and leaking she escaped from the town and was beached for repairs.  

In modern times Excelsior has been used by television and film makers in productions such Channel 4's The Real History Show: Fish and Ships, and the BBC's The Last Journey of John Keats where Andrew Motion, the poet laureate and Keats biographer who re-enacted Keats' last journey to warmer climes to delay the full onset of tuberculosis.  

Excelsior has been an extra in films like Disney's Alice Through the Looking Glass and Christopher Nolan's Dunkirk; and in productions specifically featuring her, such as ITV's Anglia Afloat, BBC's Coast, and Channel 4's Homes by the Sea.

Form Contributing to Function 

In 1856 a fish market was opened in the relatively newly constructed Harbour at Lowestoft. A rail connection was provided into the market so that express fish trains could be run direct to inland centres of population. Various smack owners decided to base their vessels in Lowestoft to take advantage of high prices being paid for fresh fish. Vessels came from various ports around the country, especially Brixham, where conditions may not have been so favourable.  

The vessels of each fishing station had characteristics to suit the local conditions. This may involve the placing of gear on one side rather than the other to suite the local trawling grounds and the prevailing wind, or the nature and method of stowing the ship’s boat to suit the method of landing the catch.  

Lowestoft’s first fleet was therefore a hotch-potch of craft that were large enough to reach the plentiful trawling grounds of the Southern North Sea and withstand the conditions that could be met a day’s sail from any shelter. 

As new vessels were ordered, a standard local design settled out remarkably quickly. One must bear in mind that Lowestoft had no local smack builders when the port came into existence, so owners went to established yards around the country until yards had set up in Lowestoft. The local yards could never meet the local demand in what had become a Klondyke town - because of the rail connection to lucrative inland markets.   Therefore, a significant part of the fleet was always made up of smacks built elsewhere.  

Wherever a smack was built, the specification was always that for Lowestoft - not that of the builder, or the builders' home ports. Thus, a Rye-built Lowestoft smack was nothing like a Rye smack. This causes great confusion to local historians who often write over-enthusiastically about the size of their fishing fleets believing all local construction to have been for their locality. A study of port fishing registers is a better way to estimate the size of local fleets and even then, the vessels of minor nearby fishing stations are included in the registers which distort figures for the main port. For example, on the Rye Register, Hastings was a subsidiary fishing station yet latterly had a larger fishing fleet than Rye.  

The main characteristics of a Lowestoft smack were:
A hull size to suit single-boat fishing for as long as it took to reach the local grounds, trawl every tide, and return before the ice used to preserve the catch melted i.e. up to four or five days.
A hull form that did not have to take the ground every tide, as the berthing in Lowestoft was alongside.
A deep draught, straight keel, and high deadrise for good seakeeping during the winter when fishing was at its best.  
Full bows to suit the short steep seas of the North Sea, as opposed to the narrow bows of vessels fishing the long Atlantic swells of St George's Channel. Such vessels were too wet forward in North Sea conditions.
Port-handed i.e. arranged for shooting the gear to port.
With a 14' boat, as opposed to a 16'-18' one used by the 'fleeters' to 'trunk' or transfer the daily catch at sea to a fast cutter, to take the fleet’s catch to a distant market.
Without a gate in the rail for the boat (as at Brixham) because a boat was not needed to land the catch at Lowestoft. 
The most powerful and manageable rig for the size of the crew, and for being able to trawl against the tide whichever way the wind was blowing. This was the cutter rig.

In the 1870s a significant development occurred. This was the provision of a steam capstan to haul the trawl thus saving the need for capstan hands. However, the reduced crew of five could not handle the great mainsail of the cutter rig, so the rig was changed to ketch to break down the sails into more manageable sizes.  

Thus, the characteristics of the Lowestoft smack remained until the last was built in about 1923 when the fleet was being displaced by steam.  

As one of the last smacks built in Lowestoft, Excelsior had the benefit of their empirical development over the preceding half-century and she is absolutely representative of the local design.

The Significance of Excelsior the Historic Vessel 

Excelsior fished out of Lowestoft for 12 years (1921-33), she traded around Norway as a motor coaster for 34 years (1937-1971); she has been laid up or undergoing rebuilds for 19 years (1933-36 and 1972-88); and has been operating as an historical sail training vessel for 41 years at the time of writing (2020). So, for the greater part of her working life she has been a Lowestoft smack, and for the greatest part of that existence she has been successfully and safely operated as an authentic historical vessel demonstrating her type and being on display to the public wherever she goes. This has included taking part in great maritime events such as the Tall Ships Races, and visits to places as far apart Bergen, Oporto, and St Petersburg. During this period, she has clocked up 130,000 miles and been seen by millions of people while taking 10,000 people to sea to experience what it is like to sail a Lowestoft Smack. In 2016, she was appointed a Regional Flagship of the year by National Historic Ships.

Excelsior's history as an operational museum ship is therefore an ongoing part of her working life, as opposed to being a dead, or 'pickled', museum exhibit.  

The philosophy behind this, it is claimed, out-performs that for many other historical vessels both in terms of degree of exposure to the widest possible audience, and in keeping alive the necessary skills for operating and maintaining an historical wooden vessel, and in training those who wish to gain those skills.  

This preservation methodology was developed in the light of what was happening to museum ships at the time (the 1970s), long before the creation of National Historic Ships. It was believed Excelsior stood more chance of survival in the environment for which she was built i.e. the sea, than laid up in a museum berth and subject to rot - in spite of the perceived risks of taking an historic artefact to sea. Furthermore, using a vessel preserves a much fuller knowledge of the artefact by maintaining the skills of 'using'; and in wearing the vessel out, the skills of 'maintaining' are preserved as well. This is 'preservation in the round'.  

Some modern publications over-emphasise the importance of preserving the fabric while under-appreciating the importance of keeping the associated skills alive. In 2005, when the threat to skills was becoming apparent nationally the Excelsior Trust addressed the issue by purchasing a shipyard where the skills and necessary equipment have been accumulated and are available to maintain Excelsior appropriately into the future. However, skills cannot simply be recorded and filed away. Each skill has to be passed on by repeated application under a master. The Trust is constantly striving to improve Excelsior's maintenance management regime, which includes giving people an insight into what is involved in looking after a large wooden hull, as well as training as many people as possible to be able to maintain Excelsior in the traditional way. 

Wooden vessels are relatively short-life timber structures that require constant maintenance and the timely replacement of time-expired components in order to survive in working order. So, to prevent the gradual degradation of an historic vessel that is 'in use' through expedient alterations, a set of record drawings was produced, and very detailed maintenance instructions incorporated into the vessels Safety Management System (which includes the Operating and Maintenance Manual). This sets out the benchmark for Excelsior, the Lowestoft smack, to prevent the gradual degradation of the historical design that would otherwise take place if her purpose were purely to provide traditional sailing experience. It is claimed that this document exceeds anything similar for any other working historic vessel in Britain.

In summary, it is important to allow different historical vessel management methodologies to co-exist so that their relative success can be assessed over the long term. The Excelsior Trust provides one such alternative through Excelsior.

References

Published Sources 
British Sailing Trawlers by Edgar J March; David & Charles (1953 & 1970)
Sailing Craft of East Anglia by Finch, Roger and Benham, Hervey; Terence Dalton (1989)
The Fishing Gear of England and Wales by F M Davis (1923)
A high-quality photograph of the previous EXCELSIOR was available from Ford Jenkins, (Photographers) of Lowestoft.  This was significant because the spars and rig were transferred to the new EXCELSIOR when the old EXCELSIOR hull was condemned following a collision.  It was possible to print blow-ups of this rig from the glass plate negative.  

Please note that EXCELSIOR’s restoration and maintenance plan long predate the publication of books like Conserving Historic Vessels.

Other Sources 
A succession of Lowestoft shipwrights (Ted Frost, Fred Newson, Roy (Diddy) Brown, Ernie ?), and smacksmen (George Moore, Bill Knobbs, George Evans, Bob Evans, and Percy Thorpe), a spar and pump-maker (Harry Wren), a blacksmith (Syd Cooke), a coppersmith (? Burwood), and a beatster (Paul Mean), all time-served, were able to advise on EXCELSIOR’s restoration back to fishing condition.  In addition smacksman Bill Nobbs was able to provide a series of photographs of life aboard various Lowestoft smacks which he took between the Wars.  

Much Lowestoft terminology was thereby acquired which we endeavour to keep in use, and which is recorded in the On-Board Training Manual.

Jack Strong, the son of Jimmy Strong, EXCELSIOR’s first skipper, was able to provide a third of the crew lists from when she was fishing, and he and his sister, Ailsa Spindler, were able to provide information on their father and his exploits during the First World War.

Harald Stensland, the son of EXCELSIOR’s first owner in Norway was able to provide cargo lists for the duration of the Stensland ownership and details of here exploits during the Second World War.

See also 
Mincarlo - last surviving Lowestoft Sidewinder fishing trawler.

References

External links 

 The Excelsior Trust

1921 ships
Ships built in Lowestoft
Museum ships in the United Kingdom
Fishing vessels of the United Kingdom
Ships and vessels of the National Historic Fleet